Nationality words link to articles with information on the nation's poetry or literature (for instance, Irish or France).

Events
January 20 — Miller Williams of Arkansas reads his poem, "Of History and Hope," at President Clinton's inauguration.
 Regeneration (titled Behind the Lines in the United States), a film about World War I poets Wilfred Owen and Siegfried Sassoon, is released. It is based on the novel Regeneration by Pat Barker.
 Jacket online literary magazine founded.

Works published in English
Listed by nation where the work was first published and again by the poet's native land, if different; substantially revised works listed separately:

Canada
 Michael Barnholden, On the Ropes (Coach House Books) 
 Dionne Brand, Land to Light On
 Clint Burnham, Be Labour Reading (ECW Press) 
 Kwame Dawes, editor, Wheel and Come again: An Anthology of Reggae Poetry, Fredericton, New Brunswick: Goose Lane.
 Louis Dudek, The Caged Tiger. Montreal: Empyreal Press.
John Glassco, Selected Poems with Three Notes on the Poetic Process.  Ottawa: Golden Dog Press)
 Elisabeth Harvor, The Long Cold Green Evenings of Spring
 Roy Kiyooka, Pacific Windows: The Collected Poems of Roy Kiyooka (posthumous), edited by Roy Miki
 A.M. Klein, Selected Poems. Selected Poems  Seymour Mayne, Zailig Pollock, Usher Caplan ed. Toronto: U of Toronto P, 1997.  
 Laura Lush:
 Darkening In, Montreal: Véhicule Press
 Fault Line, Montreal: Véhicule Press
 Don McKay, Apparatus
 George McWhirter, Incubus: The Dark Side of the Light
 John Reibetanz:
 Midland Summer
 Near Finisterre

India, in English
 R. Parthasarathy Rough Passage ( Poetry in English ). New Delhi: Oxford University Press, India 1977. 
 Jeet Thayil, Apocalypso ( Poetry in English ), London: Aark Arts, 1997, 
 Sudeep Sen, Postmarked India: New & Selected Poems ( Poetry in English ), New Delhi: HarperCollins, 
 Eunice de Souza, editor, Nine Indian Women Poets, New Delhi: Oxford University Press, 
 Svami Bhumananda Sarasvati, editor and translator, Anthology of Vedic Hymns: Being a Collection of Hymns from the Four Vedas, Sahibabad, Ghaziabad: Kusum Lat Arya Pratishthan, India.

Ireland
 Moya Cannon, The Parchment Boat, Oldcastle: The Gallery Press, 
 Michael Coady, All Souls (poems and prose), Oldcastle: The Gallery Press, 
 Aidan Murphy, Stark Naked Blues, New Island Books, 
 William Wall, Mathematics And Other Poems, Collins Press, Cork

New Zealand
 Fleur Adcock, Looking Back, Oxford and Auckland: Oxford University Press (New Zealand poet who moved to England in 1963)
 Jenny Bornholdt, Gregory O'Brien, and Mark Williams, editors, An Anthology of New Zealand Poetry in English, Auckland: Oxford University Press New Zealand (anthology)
 Jenny Bornholdt, Miss New Zealand: Selected Poems
 Diane Brown, Before The Divorce We Go To Disneyland, Tandem Press
 Alan Brunton, Years Ago Today, documentary essay on poetry in the 1960s, Bumper Books
 Allen Curnow, Early Days Yet: New and Collected Poems 1941-1997
 Kendrick Smithyman, Atua Wera, Auckland: Auckland University Press, posthumous
 Paula Green, Cookhouse, Auckland University Press

United Kingdom
 Fleur Adcock, Looking Back, Oxford and Auckland: Oxford University Press (New Zealand poet who moved to England in 1963)
 Simon Armitage, CloudCuckooLand (sic.)
 Charles Causley, Collected Poems (see also Collected Poems 1975)
 Gillian Clarke, Collected Poems, Carcanet Press, 
 Elaine Feinstein, Daylight, Carcanet
 Lavinia Greenlaw, A World Where News Travelled Slowly, Faber and Faber
 Ted Hughes, Tales from Ovid; a New York Times "notable book of the year" for 1998
 Elizabeth Jennings, In the Meantime
 Jamie McKendrick, The Marble Fly
 Anne MacLeod, Standing by Thistles (Scottish poet)
 Derek Mahon, The Yellow Book. Gallery Press
 Andrew Motion, Salt Water
 Sean O'Brien, The Ideology (Smith/Doorstep)
 Don Paterson, God's Gift to Women
 Peter Reading, Work in Regress
 Peter Redgrove:
 Orchard End
 What the Black Mirror Saw: New Short Fiction and Prose Poetry
 Robin Robertson, A Painted Field
 Labi Siffre, Monument
 Anthony Thwaite, Selected Poems 1956–1996
 Charles Tomlinson, Selected Poems 1955–1997

Anthologies in the United Kingdom
 Thomas Rain Crowe with Gwendal Denez and Tom Hubbard, Writing the Wind: A Celtic resurgence: The New Celtic Poetry: Welsh, Breton, Irish Gaelic, Scottish Gaelic, Cornish, Manx,  Cullowhee, NC: New Native Press
 Michael Donaghy, Andrew Motion, Hugo Williams, poets in Penguin Modern Poets 11, Penguin
 Iona Opie and Peter Opie, The Oxford Dictionary of Nursery Rhymes, Oxford: Oxford University Press

Criticism, scholarship, and biography in the United Kingdom
 R. F. Foster, W. B. Yeats: A Life, Vol. I: The Apprentice Mage, Oxford University Press

United States
 Kim Addonizio, Jimmy & Rita (BOA Editions) 1997
 Agha Shahid Ali, The Country Without a Post Office (Indian-born poet of Kashmiri heritage)
 Dick Allen, Ode to the Cold War: Poems New and Selected (Sarabande)
 A.R. Ammons, Glare
 Marvin Bell, Ardor (The Book of the Dead Man, Volume 2) (Copper Canyon Press)
 Wendell Berry, Entries (Washington, D.C.: Counterpoint)
 Frank Bidart, Desire (Farrar, Straus and Giroux), received the Theodore Roethke Memorial Poetry Prize and the 1998 Bobbitt Prize for Poetry; nominated for the Pulitzer Prize, the National Book Award, and the National Book Critics Circle Award
 Allison Hedge Coke, [Dog Road Woman (Coffee House Press), "American Book Award"
 Alfred Corn, Present (Washington: Counterpoint Press)
 Tess Gallagher, At the Owl Woman Saloon (Scribner), a New York Times "notable book of the year"
 Amy Clampitt, The Collected Poems of Amy Clampitt (Knopf), published posthumously, a New York Times "notable book of the year"
 Jorie Graham, The Errancy: Poems (Ecco), a New York Times "notable book of the year"
 Beth Gylys, Balloon Heart (Wind Publications), Winner of the Quentin R. Howard Award.
 Robert Fagles (translator), The Odyssey by Homer (Viking), a New York Times "notable book of the year"
 Susan Hahn, Confession (University of Chicago Press)
 Anthony Hecht and John Hollander, Jiggery-Pokery: A Compendium of Double Dactyls
 Paul Hoover, Viridian (University of Georgia Press)
 Fanny Howe, One Crossed Out
 Jane Kenyon, Otherwise: New and Selected Poems (Graywolf), a New York Times "notable book of the year"
 Maxine Kumin, Selected Poems, 1960-1990 (Norton), a New York Times "notable book of the year"
 Robert Hass, Sun Under Wood: New Poems (Ecco), a New York Times "notable book of the year"
 John Hollander, The Work of Poetry (Columbia University Press)
 Maxine Kumin, Selected Poems, 1960-1990 (W.W. Norton)
 Philip Levine, Unselected Poems (Greenhouse Review Press)
 Sarah Lindsay, Primate Behavior (Grove Press), National Book Award finalist
 William Meredith, Effort at Speech: New and Selected Poems
 W. S. Merwin, Flower and Hand: Poems, 1977-1983 (Port Townsend, Washington: Copper Canyon Press)
 Howard Nemerov, The Collected Poems of Howard Nemerov (which wins  the Pulitzer Prize for Poetry, the National Book Award, and the Bollingen Prize)
 Mary Oliver, West Wind: Poems and Prose Poems
 Carl Rakosi, The Earth Suite 1997
 Kenneth Rexroth, Sacramental Acts: The Love Poems
 Rosmarie Waldrop, Another Language: Selected Poems (Talisman House)
 C. K. Williams, The Vigil (Farrar Straus), nominated for the National Book Critics Circle Award
 David Wojahn, The Falling Hour (University of Pittsburgh Press)
 Charles Wright, BlackZodiac (Farrar Straus)

Criticism, scholarship, and biography in the United States
 Kim Addonizio and Dorianne Laux, The Poet's Companion: A Guide to the Pleasures of Writing Poetry
 Joseph Blotner, Robert Penn Warren: A Biography. (Random House), one of The New York Times "notable books of the year"
 Bonnie Costello, Celeste Goodridge and Cristanne Miller, editors, The Selected Letters of Marianne Moore (Knopf), one of The New York Times "notable books of the year"
 Angela Davis, Blues Legacies and Black Feminism: Gertrude "Ma" Rainey, Bessie Smith, and Billie Holiday, 1997 American Book Award
 Phyllis Grosskurth, Byron: The Flawed Angel (Peter Davison/Houghton Mifflin), one of The New York Times "notable books of the year"
 Douglas Hofstadter, Le Ton Beau de Marot: In Praise of the Music of Language (Basic Books) "ruminations on the art of translation" with a 16th-century French poem as the prime example, one of The New York Times "notable books of the year"
 John Hollander, The Work of Poetry (criticism)
 Sam McCready, A William Butler Yeats Encyclopedia, Greenwood Press (scholarship)
 Nicholas Murray, A Life of Matthew Arnold (Thomas Dunne/St. Martin's), one of The New York Times "notable books of the year"
 Helen Vendler, The Art of Shakespeare's Sonnets (Belknap/Harvard University), one of The New York Times "notable books of the year"

Anthologies in the United States
 Harold Bloom edits The Best of the Best American Poetry 1988-1997
 Ross and Kathryn Petras, editors, Very Bad Poetry (Vintage)

The Best American Poetry 1997
Poems from these 75 poets are in The Best American Poetry 1997, edited by David Lehman, guest editor James Tate:

Ai
Sherman Alexie
Agha Shahid Ali
A. R. Ammons
Nin Andrews
L. S. Asekoff 
Leevester Clay 
John Ashbery
Marianne Boruch
Catherine Bowman
Joseph Brodsky
Stephanie Brown
Joshua Clover
Billy Collins
Gillian Conoley
Jayne Cortez

Robert Creeley
Carl Dennis
William Dickey
Robert Dow
Thomas Sayers Ellis
Irving Feldman
Herman Fong
Dick Gallup
Martin Galvin
Amy Gerstler
Allen Ginsberg
Dana Gioia
Elton Glaser
Kate Gleason
Albert Goldbarth

Jorie Graham
Donald Hall
Daniel Halpern
Robert Hass
Bob Hicok
Paul Hoover
Christine Hume
Harry Humes
Don Hymans
Lawson Fusao Inada
Richard Jackson
Gray Jacobik
George Kalamaras
Jennifer L. Knox
Philip Kobylarz

Yusef Komunyakaa
Elizabeth Kostova
Denise Levertov
Larry Levis
Matthew Lippman
Beth Lisick
Khaled Mattawa
William Matthews
Josip Novakovich
Geoffrey Nutter
Catie Rosemurgy
Clare Rossini
Mary Ruefle
Hillel Schwartz
Maureen Seaton

Vijay Seshadri
Steven Sherrill
Charles Simic
Charlie Smith
Leon Stokesbury
Mark Strand
Jack Turner
Karen Volkman
Derek Walcott
Rosanna Warren
Lewis Warsh
Terence Winch
Eve Wood
Charles Wright
Dean Young

Other in English
 Margaret Avison, Not Yet but Still, Australia

Works published in other languages
Listed by nation where the work was first published and again by the poet's native land, if different; substantially revised works listed separately:

French language

France
 Olivier Barbarant, Aragon: la mémoire et l'excès, publisher: Editions Champ Vallon, 
 Yves Bonnefoy, L'Encore Aveugle,
 Seyhmus Dagtekin, Artères-solaires, publisher: L'Harmattan; Kurdish Turkish poet writing in French, living in and published in France

Canada, in French
 Suzanne Jacob, La part de feu, Montréal: Boréal, winner of the prix de la Société Radio-Canada, and prix du Gouverneur général
 Pierre Nepveu, Romans-fleuves, Montréal: Le Noroît

Hebrew
 Aharon Shabtai, Be-xodesh May ha-nifla’ ("In the Wonderful Month of May")
 Rami Saari, Maslul Ha-k'ev Ha-no"az ("The Route of the Bold Pain")

India
In each section, listed in alphabetical order by first name:

Bengali
 Joy Goswami, Kabita-Songroho, Vol. 2, Kolkata: Ananda Publishers,  (third reprint in 2002)
 Nirendranath Chakravarti, Shondharaater Kobita, Kolkata: Ananda Publishers
 Udaya Narayana Singh, Ashru o Parihaas, Kolkata: Pritoniya
 Subrata Bandyopadhyay, Saodāgara o The final judgement ("Saudagar and the Final Judgement"), Kalakata: De'ja Pābaliśiṃ

Other in India
 Jiban Narah, Dhou Khela Loralir San, Guwahati, Assam: Nibedon; Indian, Assamese-language
 Jayant Kaikini, Neelimale, Bangalore: Patrike Prakashana, Indian, Kannada-language poet, short-story writer, and screenwriter
 K. G. Sankara Pillai, K.G. Shankara Pillayude Kavithakal 1969-1996, Kottayam, Kerala: D C Books; Malayalam-language
 K. Siva Reddy, Naa Kalala Nadi Anchuna, Hyderabad: Jhari Poetry Circle; Telugu-language
 Kanaka Ha Ma, Papanashini, Puttur, Karnataka: Kannada Sangha; Kannada language
 Namdeo Dhasal, Andhale Shatak, Mumbai: Ambedkara Prabodhini; Marathi-language

Poland
 Stanisław Barańczak, Zimy i podroze ("Winter and Journeys"), Krakow: Wydawnictwo Literackie
 Ewa Lipska, Ludzie dla poczatkujacych, ("People for Beginners"); Poznan: a5
 Tomasz Różycki, Vaterland, Łódź: Stowarzyszenie Literackie im. K.K. Baczyńskiego
 Piotr Sommer, Nowe stosunki wyrazów. Wiersze z lat siedemdziesiątych i osiemdziesiątych
 Wisława Szymborska: Sto wierszy - sto pociech ("100 Poems - 100 Happinesses")
 Eugeniusz Tkaczyszyn-Dycki, Liber mortuorum

Spain
 Matilde Camus, Mundo interior ("Inner World")

Other
 Mario Benedetti, La vida ese paréntesis, Uruguay
 Attilio Bertolucci, La lucertola di Casarola, previously unpublished poems, many written in his youth; Italy
 Christoph Buchwald, general editor, and Ror Wolf, guest editor, Jahrbuch der Lyrik 1997/98 ("Poetry Yearbook 1997/98"), publisher: Beck; anthology
 Chen Kehua, Bie ai moshengren ("Don’t Make Love to Strangers") Chinese (Taiwan)
 Alexander Mezhirov:
 Позёмка ("Drifting"), Russia
 Apologii︠a︡ t︠s︡irka: kniga novykh stikhov ("Apologia of the Circus"), including a version of "Blizzard", St. Petersburg, Russia
 Wang Xiaoni, Wode zhili baozhe wo de huo ("My paper wraps my fire"), China

Awards and honors

Australia
 C. J. Dennis Prize for Poetry: Les Murray, Subhuman Redneck Poems
 Dinny O'Hearn Poetry Prize: Joint winners
Dragons in their Pleasant Places by Peter Porter
The Wild Reply by Emma Lew
 Kenneth Slessor Prize for Poetry: Anthony Lawrence, The Viewfinder
 Mary Gilmore Prize: Emma Lew - The Wild Reply

Canada
 Gerald Lampert Award: Marilyn Dumont, A Really Good Brown Girl
 Archibald Lampman Award: Diana Brebner, Flora & Fauna
 1997 Governor General's Awards: Dionne Brand, Land to Light On (English); Pierre Nepveu, Romans-fleuves (French)
 Pat Lowther Award: Marilyn Bowering, Autobiography
 Prix Alain-Grandbois: Claude Beausoleil, Grand hôtel des étrangers
 Dorothy Livesay Poetry Prize: Margo Button, The Unhinging of Wings
 Prix Émile-Nelligan: Patrick Lafontaine, L’Ambition du vide

India
 Sahitya Akademi Award : Leeladhar Jagudi for Anubhav Ke Aakash Mein Chaand
 Poetry Society India National Poetry Competition : Ranjit Hoskote for Portrait of a Lady

New Zealand 
  Montana New Zealand Book Awards, First Book Award for Poetry: Diane Brown, Before the Divorce We Go To Disneyland, Tandem Press

United Kingdom
 Cholmondeley Award: Alison Brackenbury, Gillian Clarke, Tony Curtis, Anne Stevenson
 Eric Gregory Award: Matthew Clegg, Sarah Corbett, Polly Clark, Tim Kendall, Graham Nelson, Matthew Welton
 Forward Poetry Prize Best Collection:  Jamie McKendrick, The Marble Fly (Oxford University Press)
 Forward Poetry Prize Best First Collection: Robin Robertson, A Painted Field (Picador)
 T. S. Eliot Prize (United Kingdom and Ireland): Don Paterson, God's Gift to Women
 Whitbread Award for poetry and book of the year: Ted Hughes, Tales from Ovid
 National Poetry Competition : Neil Rollinson for The Constellations

United States
 Agnes Lynch Starrett Poetry Prize: Richard Blanco, City of a Hundred Fires
 Aiken Taylor Award for Modern American Poetry: Fred Chappell
 American Academy of Arts and Letters Gold Medal in Poetry, John Ashbery
 AML Award for poetry to Susan Elizabeth Howe for Stone Spirits
 Bernard F. Connors Prize for Poetry: John Drury, "Burning the Aspern Papers"
 Bollingen Prize: Gary Snyder
 National Book Award for poetry: William Meredith, Effort at Speech: New & Selected Poems
 Poet Laureate Consultant in Poetry to the Library of Congress: Robert Pinsky appointed
 Pulitzer Prize for Poetry: Lisel Mueller: Live Together: New and Selected Poems
 Ruth Lilly Poetry Prize: William Matthews
 Wallace Stevens Award: Anthony Hecht
 Whiting Awards: Connie Deanovich, Forrest Gander, Jody Gladding, Mark Turpin
 Fellowship of the Academy of American Poets: John Haines
 North Carolina Poet Laureate: Fred Chappell appointed.

Deaths
Birth years link to the corresponding "[year] in poetry" article:
 January 19 – James Dickey, 73 (born 1923), American
 April 5 – Allen Ginsberg, 70 (born 1926), of liver cancer, American
 May 15 – Laurie Lee, 82, English poet, novelist and screenwriter
 August 27 – Johannes Edfelt, 92, Swedish
 October 19 – Stella Sierra, 80, (born 1917), Panamanian
 November 12:
James Laughlin, 83, American poet, publisher and man of letters
William Matthews, 55, American poet and essayist, of a heart attack
 November 17 – David Ignatow, 83, American poet
 November 30 – Kathy Acker, 53, American postmodernist experimental novelist and punk poet
 December 13 – Claude Roy, pen name of Claude Orland (born 1915), French poet, novelist, essayist, art critic and journalist; an activist in the Communist Party until his expulsion in 1956
 December 20 – Denise Levertov, 74, of lymphoma

See also

Poetry
List of years in poetry
List of poetry awards

References

20th-century poetry
Poetry